The Bom Jesus do Monte Funicular, is a Portuguese funicular transport in civil parish of Nogueiró e Tenões, in the municipality of Braga, in the district of the same name. Operated by the Irmandade de Bom Jesus do Monte the funicular connects the upper-town of Braga with the Shrine on which it gets its name, over a distance that parallels the Escadaria de Bom Jesus (Bom Jesus staircase) to the highest point at the statue of Saint Longinus.

History 

Construction on the tramway system began in April 1880, designed by Raoul Mesnier du Ponsard, under the direction of Swiss engineer Nikolaus Riggenbach, and financed by Bracarense businessman Manuel Joaquim Gomes, the principal shareholder of the Companhia de Carris of Braga. Gomes was interested in replacing the role of the horsecar (rail vehicles pulled by horses), which originally stretched to the Bom Jesus sanctuary, but was complemented by oxen up the steep hill on busy days. The trams were constructed by SLM - Oficinas de Olten.

Work began in March 1880, with Portuguese engineer of French descent Raoul Mesnier du Ponsard supervising the work. The funicular was inaugurated on 25 March 1882, and cost around 30 contos de réis. Its success was such that in the same year Mesnier was invited to design and install a series of funiculars and cable lifts in the Portuguese capital Lisbon, some of which are still in operation today.

In 1914, the Companhia de Carris was expropriated by the municipal council, resulting in the municipality exploiting the tourist transport. A campaign of restoration was carried out in 1946 using materials derived from the dismantling of a Mount Train, in the city of Funchal, on the island of Madeira.

But, by the 1970s-1980s, the funicular passed to the responsibility of the Confraria do Bom Jesus do Monte.

On 13 March 2003, a dispatch was issued to classify the funicular as national patrimony.

Following three months when the service was stopped for restoration, on 10 July 2006, the funicular returned to service.

On 18 October 2012, the decision to classify the funicular transport as a Monumento de Interesse Público was issued (Diário da República, Série 2, 202, Announcement 13592/2012).

Description

The funicular is situated in a rural, isolated location surrounded by luxuriant vegetation, paralleling the Bom Jesus do Monte staircase, and connects the base of the hill with the sanctuary.

It functions using two parallel  tracks, each with its own tram and central rack, laid on wooden sleepers over stone ballast. The trams are connected by a steel cable. The suspension system is made of four helical without dampers and hinged spiral-spring stop brakes. Each tram supports a capacity of seat 30 passengers, with the total capacity of 38 possible across six bunks (that sat five passengers), eight standing and conductor.

Each cabin includes two water tanks, with the largest with a capacity for  that functioned as a counterweight and supported refrigeration circuit for the brakes, and the small tank with a capacity for  that supported the rear brakes. Both trams run is opposite directions, arriving at their opposite stops simultaneously. It is the oldest funicular in the world moved by water counterbalancing, loading water into the car at the top of the hill, weighing it down so it descends to the bottom, at the same time drawing the lighter, drained car up the hill, where the process starts all over again: the trip takes between 2.4 and 4 minutes.

Stations
The base terminal is a rectangular stop, comprising three bodies with the central more elevated then the lateral wings, plastered and painted in white, with corners, cornices and frames in granite. The principal facade is slightly extended and elevated by several steps to wooden entrance and exit doorways and their divisions, with lateral facades marked by single doors. The interior is occupied by access platform to the trams.

The upper stop included lateral platforms of cobbled slope, with access to the rail line by a double staircase in granite, diverging at the top.

References

Notes

Sources
  
 
 

Braga
Railway lines opened in 1882
Water-powered funicular railways
Funicular railways in Portugal
Standard gauge railways in Portugal
Properties of Public Interest in Portugal